Jagannatha Perumal Temple (also called Tirumaḻisai Temple is dedicated to Hindu god Vishnu located in Tirumalisai, Chennai City, Tiruvallur district, in the South Indian state of Tamil Nadu. Constructed in the Dravidian style of architecture, dedicated to Vishnu, who is worshipped as Jagannatha Perumal and his consort Lakshmi as Thirumangaivalli. The temple is believed to be the birthplace of Thirumalisai Alvar, one of the twelve Alvars whose work is compiled as Divya Prabandha, the early medieval Tamil canon of the Alvar saints from the 6th–9th centuries CE.

The temple is open from 7 a.m. to 11 a.m. and 5 p.m. to 8 p.m and has six daily rituals at various times of the day. Various festivals are celebrated in the temple, with the Aani Brahmotsavam, Aipasi Manavala Maamuni festival during October - November and Maasi float festival during February - March being the most prominent. The temple is maintained and administered by the Hindu Religious and Endowment Board of the Government of Tamil Nadu.

Legend

According to the Hindu legend, the Saptarishis, the seven sages, wanted to have a view of Madhya Jagannatha (literally meaning Jagannatha located in the middle). As per Hindu legend, the Jaganatha at Puri Jagannatha Temple is called Vada Jagannatha (located in the North) and the one located in Adi Jagannatha Perumal Temple at Thirupullani is called Keeḻa Jagannatha. Acceding to the request of the sages, Vishnu is believed to have appeared as Madhya Jagannatha at this place. The place is also believed to be the birthplace of Thirumalisai Alvar, one of the twelve Alvars whose work is compiled as Divya Prabandha, the early medieval Tamil canon of the Alvar saints from the 6th–9th centuries CE. His works include Tiruvanthai and Tiruchanda Viruttam, which are included in the canon.

History
Thirumazhisai was originally called by various names like Chrukuravalli-Chaturvedimanagalam, Pakkaturaivalla-Chaturvedimangalam, Mahisaram and Mahaksehtram on account of the number of Vedic people settled here during the Chola and Vijayanagara period. The inscriptions on the walls of the temple are from the chola regime during the 11-12th centuries and Vijayanagara period during the 14-15th centuries. The inscriptions are made in Tamil or in ancient Tamil scripts indicating gift of land, lamps and houses to the temple. The oldest inscription is found from the period of Kulothunga Chola III (1179-1216 CE) indicating gift of land to the temple. Vijaya Gandagopala, a chieftain during the 12th century has endowed gifts to the temple. There are also inscriptions from the period of Kopperunjinga during the 13th century. Harihara Raya II (1377-1404 CE) and Virupaksha Raya II (1465-85 CE), the rulers of the Vijayanagara Empire have donated gifts to the temple as indicated in the inscriptions. In modern times, the temple is maintained and administered by the Hindu Religious and Endowment Board of the Government of Tamil Nadu.

Architecture

It is located in Tirumalisai, a suburb in Tiruvallur, the capital of the South Indian state of Tamil Nadu. The presiding deity housed in the sanctum, is an image made of granite seen in seated posture with his right leg bent and left leg left hanging. The images of Rukmini and Satyabhama are located on either of his sides. The shrine of Garuda facing Jagannatha Perumal, the eagle mount of Vishnu, is located axial to the central shrine. The central shrine is approached through Mahamandapa, the worship hall and a narrow Ardha mandapam. The Mahamandapa has a twenty eight pillared hall with sculptured pillars depicting Vaishnava mythology. The flagpost is located behind the shrine of Garuda, axial to the central shrine and the gateway tower. There are images of Alvars in the worship hall on both sides and the shrine of Yathirajavalli is located in the second precinct. The vimana, the roof over the sanctum, has stucco images of Hayagriva, Lakshmi Narasimha and Garuda. The northern side of the Mahamandapa has the shrine of Thirumalisai Alvar, which houses the image of the Alvar in seated posture with his hands sported with praying gesture. The second precinct has the shrine of Thirumangaivalli Thayar. There are other shrines in the temple dedicated to Lakshmi Narasimha, Manavala Mamunigal and Andal. There is a four pillared hall in front of the gopuram having sculpted images in the pillars from the Vijayanagara period. There is a Kalayana Mandapa, Vahana Mandapa for housing the divine vehicles and a Paramapada vasal.

Worship practices and festivals

The temple follows the Tenkalai tradition of worship based on Vaikasana Agamic tradition. The temple is open from 6:30 a.m. to 12 p.m. and 4:00 p.m. to 8:30 p.m. The temple priests perform the pooja (rituals) during festivals and on a daily basis. As at other Vishnu temples of Tamil Nadu, the priests belong to the Vaishnavaite community, a Brahmin sub-caste. The temple rituals are performed four times a day: Ushathkalam at 8 a.m., Kalasanthi at 10:00 a.m., Sayarakshai at 5:00 p.m. and Ardha Jamam at 8:00 p.m. Each ritual has three steps: alangaram (decoration), neivethanam (food offering) and deepa aradanai (waving of lamps) for both Jagannatha Perumal and his consort Thirumangaivalli. There are weekly, monthly and fortnightly rituals performed in the temple.

Various festivals are celebrated in the temple, with the Aani Brahmotsavam (during June - July), Aipasi Manavala Maamuni festival during October - November and Maasi float festival during February - March being the most prominent. During Aani Brahmotsavam, the temple car housing the festival deities of Jagannatha Perumal and Thirumanjavalli is drawn around the streets of Tirumalisai. During the float festival in February–March, the presiding deities are drawn in a float in the temple tank. The temple is maintained and administered by the Hindu Religious and Endowment Board of the Government of Tamil Nadu.

References

External links

Hindu temples in Tiruvallur district
Vishnu temples